The Yosemite Lumber Company was an early 20th century Sugar Pine and White Pine logging operation in the Sierra Nevada. The company built the steepest logging incline ever, a   route that tied the high-country timber tracts in Yosemite National Park to the low-lying Yosemite Valley Railroad running alongside the Merced River. From there, the logs went by rail to the company’s sawmill at Merced Falls, about fifty-four miles west of El Portal.

Two special acts of Congress allowed the company to harvest timber in Yosemite National Park under the guidance that only "dead and decaying" timber be cut. An immense production allowance of two hundred million board feet suggested this was a loosely interpreted restriction. The company averaged a yearly cut of fifty-five million board feet during its thirty years in business. During that time, Yosemite Sugar Pine ran five shay locomotives across a hundred miles of track. 

1n 1937, the federal government forced the sale of 7,200 acres of the company’s finest sugar pine tracts, annexing them for protection inside the boundaries of Yosemite National Park. With its remaining timber holdings insufficient the company folded in 1942.

Logging

The Steepest Logging Incline Ever Built 

The Yosemite Lumber Company constructed a railroad incline to access their timber holdings on a high tableland opposite El Portal. The incline, which was the steepest ever built, connected the timberlands high on the tableland with the Yosemite Valley Railroad located in the Merced River valley below. 

The Yosemite Lumber Company built the incline in 1912, which spanned  from El Portal to the top of Hennes Ridge. It featured a 48% grade at the start, changed to a 52% grade for several hundred feet, and then dropped to a 45% grade until reaching the middle of the incline. The last  to the summit were the steepest on the line, with a dizzying 78% grade. Loaded log cars were let down the incline as empty cars were pulled up, using a counterbalanced arrangement. The incline had four trestles and two overhead hold-downs. The line speed reached  feet per minute, with a handling capacity of about six cars per hour. The incline utilized  feet of  wire rope pulled by a big steam-powered hoist manufactured by Willamette Iron Works.  

All supplies and equipment used in the woods had to be pulled up the incline. The donkey yarder, in particular, had to haul itself up to the top of the incline first, which took around three months to complete. Some lumberjacks were so afraid to ride the incline they turned around at first sight and never made it into the woods.

Incline Sled

Yosemite Lumber Company carpenter Louie Farr built a six-foot-long sled for riding down the southside incline above El Portal. The left edge of the sled had two cleats that straddled one rail, fastened to their underside. The right edge had a curved metal bar on the bottom that rode on top of the ties at rail height, keeping the sled level. Ties that were slightly higher than normal were trimmed to accommodate the bar. Pulling back on the front handle tightened the cleats against the rail, providing a friction brake. Many loggers rode the sled down the steep  slope over the years, with the record from top to bottom being two and a half minutes, exceeding . However, many loggers were injured when the sled jumped the track at high speeds, leading to its discontinuation.

Timber Operations 
The Yosemite Lumber Company constructed its own logging railroad to reach their timber holdings.  They started with a small two-truck Shay locomotive in 1912. A second, larger three-truck Shay was added the following year.  The company used Yosemite Valley Railroad standard gauge bulk-head flat cars to haul timber. This meant that the same cars could move from the woods to the mill, loading only once. 

The company claimed a cut of 35,000,000 feet of lumber in the first year, employing nearly 600 men.  The Yosemite Valley Railroad began to run excursion trips to tour the mill at Merced Falls as interest in the lumber plant increased. The mill was advertised as the “most modern and up-to-date in the entire west.”  Logging occurred from April to November due to heavy snowfall in the mountains. The company took pride in its safety record before the first two fatalities occurred in July 1914.

The Yosemite Lumber Company encountered challenges during World War I, with a lack of flat cars and available workers. Nonetheless, the company persevered and shipped six cars of finished lumber daily. They extended the logging railroad to Empire Meadow, which was approximately 15 miles from the incline. In 1919, the company tested a Climax locomotive, but ultimately returned it due to its inability to maintain a full head of steam. They replaced it with a fourth Shay locomotive. 

In February 1917, the Yosemite Lumber Company and the United States government made a timber trade to preserve the scenery along the Wawona road. The company exchanged land next to the highway for government timber in less conspicuous parts of the forest. 
 
In 1921, the company cut a record of 60,000,000 feet of lumber, adding 15 new log cars and updating some mill equipment. Despite a fire in September, which caused significant damage to the bakery and dining room at Merced Falls, the outlook was positive.  In 1923, the company constructed more employee housing and adding a second story to the Yosemite Valley Railroad station. The company employed 700 workers, cutting over 70,000,000 feet of timber, an all-time record for the company at that time.

North Side Operations 

In 1923, the Yosemite Lumber Company relocated their timber operation to the north side of the Merced canyon because the available timber on the south side had been exhausted. They raised $5,000,000 through a bond issue to fund the construction of a new incline, the modernization of the mill, and the relocation of the logging railroad. A crew of 200 men worked around the clock to complete the new incline by the 1924 season.

The 8300-foot long incline, which cost almost $1,000,000, required over 400 rollers to maintain its position and had a maximum grade of 68%. A second incline was built above the big incline to access the timber area. Logging equipment, including four Shay locomotives, was stored on sidings until the new incline was completed. Once the hoist was operational, the locomotives, steam donkeys, and other items were taken up the new incline to the logging camps. The big hoist at the head of the incline was electrically operated with a double drum, Walker slip ring arrangement and weighed a total of 320,000 pounds. The incline was double tracked from the top to just below halfway down and was single tracked the rest of the way to the bottom. 

The company broke all records by cutting 60,000,000 board feet of lumber in 1924 and 85,000,000 in 1925, employing 500 men at the mill and another 500 in the woods timber camps with a daily payroll of $5500 at peak times. The company operated seven days a week, 10 hours a day, to generate revenue required to meet the bond payments.

Merced Falls Sawmill
The Yosemite Valley Railroad pulled log trains along the Merced River to Yosemite Lumber Company’s sawmill at Merced Falls in the San Joaquin Valley. The mill broke ground in the summer of 1911. Over 945 tons of machinery was brought to Merced Falls by train including a 600 horsepower electric plant which electrifed both the plant and the town. The mill operated seasonally, whenever the snow had cleared enough for logging trains to resume. By the 1920s, the mill delivered between 40 and 50 million feet of lumber every season and employed between 250 and 300 men.

The sale of alcohol was forbidden in the incorporated city of Merced Falls. But several saloons opened to serve mill workers just across the Mariposa County line. In 1918, a petition was raised to close the saloons as a war measure, citing the mill's role in support of government contracts.

Acquisitions & Successors

Sugar Pine Lumber Company 
In 1927, the Yosemite Lumber Company unexpectedly shut down, and rumors circulated that the White & Friant company had issued an ultimatum demanding the purchase of land to reach their own timber, which was refused. The Sugar Pine Lumber Company of Pinedale purchased the Merced Falls mill and the assets of the Yosemite Lumber Company for $6,000,000 and reopened the mill in May 1929. Initially, the plan was to bring all Yosemite Lumber Company timber to Pinedale for milling, but the Southern Pacific refused to permit the Yosemite Valley Railroad log cars on its trackage. The Sugar Pine Lumber Company was forced to reopen the Merced Falls mill, but eventually had to give up the Yosemite Lumber Company subsidiary due to the depression. Yosemite Lumber closed at the end of the 1930 season and Merced Falls dwindled into a “ghost city.”

The Yosemite Sugar Pine Company 
John Ball, president of White & Friant, saw an opportunity to utilize his timber mixed with Yosemite Lumber Company holdings by consolidating his assets and reopening the Merced Falls mill himself under the name of The Yosemite Sugar Pine Lumber Company in July 1935. A $400,000 loan by the Reconstruction Finance Corporation helped reopen the mill in 1935 as depression era relief measure. The incline was refurbished, and the five Shay locomotives were put back to work. The reformed company sent the first logs to the Merced Falls mill in September 1935, and during the late season, they cut around 13,000,000 feet of lumber before winter. Production settled at 60,000,000 board feet annually starting in 1936, but the mill could process more. The incline was upgraded with new 400 horsepower motors and a replacement wire rope cable, increasing the hoist speed by 12%. In 1938, some truck logging began, and roads were built for independent contractors to bring logs to the railroad for transport to the incline. By the end of 1942, most of the available timber had been exhausted, and the last train load of logs arrived at the mill from the Yosemite Valley Railroad on November 15, 1942.

Public Opposition 

In 1926, William Biggs Van Name wrote a circular criticizing the National Park Service and the lumber company for the devastation caused by logging in the Yosemite National Park area. However, he was unable to generate much public interest, and logging continued without much opposition. By 1937, public opposition to logging had grown, and the visit of Eleanor Roosevelt and Harold Ickes, Secretary of the Interior, led to a concerted effort to oust the lumber company. The president of Yosemite Sugar Pine, John Ball, was accused of failing to cooperate with the government. The lumber company argued that selective cutting could preserve the forests, but the issue had become too public. The purchase of the Carl Inn Tract, a stand of 7200 acres of sugar pine, was authorized by legislation and completed in 1939 for a price of $1,495,500. This effectively ended the operations of Yosemite Sugar Pine Lumber Company.

The mill operated until 1942, supplied by timber from Mariposa and Tuolumne counties north of the Merced River and west of Yosemite National Park.

Legacy 
Today, few remnants of the lumber operation remain. Within the boundaries of Yosemite National Park, many of the old Yosemite Lumber railroad beds were repurposed as part of the Yosemite West subdivision, while others have been reclaimed by the forest. In the San Joaquin Valley, the Yosemite Lumber Mill at Merced Falls is gone, and the community has become a ghost town.

Locomotive Roster 
The Yosemite Lumber Company ran Shay locomotives produced by Lima Locomotive Works. Shay engines could be run forward or backwards, and could run on poor-quality track, making them ideal for logging in the woods. Unlike the narrow-gauge run by the nearby Madera Sugar Pine Company which allowed for tighter curves and lighter rails, YSP had to run standard-gauge rolling stock because of their direct connection to Yosemite Valley Railroad.

References 

Timber industry
Logging in the United States
Companies based in California
Sierra Nevada (United States)
History of the Sierra Nevada (United States)
Defunct California railroads
Railway companies established in 1912
American companies established in 1912
Railway companies disestablished in 1942
Closed railway lines in the United States